Manitou Springs High School (MSHS) is a public high school in Manitou Springs, Colorado, United States. It is the only high school in the Manitou Springs School District 14. The high school has the highest graduation rate in the Pikes Peak Region and one of the lowest remediation rates for students entering college. Manitou teachers give students the option to prepare for the Advanced Placement testing in multiple subjects.

Notable alumni
Justin Armour (class of 1991), former NFL football player
Geoff Stults (class of 1994), actor
George Stults (class 0f 1993), actor
Atiba Jefferson (class of 1994), photographer and skateboarder

References

External links

Public high schools in Colorado
Manitou Springs, Colorado
Schools in El Paso County, Colorado